Highway 343 is a highway in the Canadian province of Saskatchewan. It runs from Highway 4 near Blumenort to Simmie near Highway 631.

Highway 343 provides access to Lac Pelletier Regional Park and connects to Highway 630.

References

343